Macalister Range is a mountain range in Far North Queensland, Australia.

It may also refer to the:
 Macalister Range, Queensland, a locality in the Cairns Region that encompasses most of the mountain range
 Macalister Range National Park, a national park protecting the Wet Tropics of the mountain range